Yekaterina Aleksandrovna Malysheva (born 28 January 1987 in Chelyabinsk, Soviet Union) is a Russian speed skater. She competed at the 2010 Winter Olympics in Vancouver, and at the 2014 Winter Olympics in Sochi.

References

External links 
 

1987 births
Living people
Speed skaters at the 2014 Winter Olympics
Russian female speed skaters
Olympic speed skaters of Russia
Speed skaters at the 2010 Winter Olympics
Sportspeople from Chelyabinsk
Universiade medalists in speed skating
Universiade silver medalists for Russia
Speed skaters at the 2007 Winter Universiade